The Year's Best Science Fiction: Thirtieth Annual Collection is a science fiction anthology edited by Gardner Dozois that was published on July 23, 2013.  It is the 30th in The Year's Best Science Fiction series.

Contents
The book includes 29 stories, all first published in 2012. The book also includes a summation by Dozois, a brief introduction by Dozois to each story, and a referenced list of honorable mentions for the year. The stories are as follows:

Indrapramit Das: "Weep for Day"
Paul McAuley: "The Man"
Jay Lake: "The Stars Do Not Lie"
Lavie Tidhar: "The Memcordist"
Pat Cadigan: "The Girl-thing Who Went Out for Sushi"
Eleanor Arnason: "Holmes Sherlock"
Richard A. Lovett and William Gleason: "Nightfall on the Peak of Eternal Light"
Andy Duncan: "Close Encounters"
Lee Mandelo: "The Finite Canvas"
Sean McMullen: "Steamgothic"
Elizabeth Bear: "In the House of Aryaman, a Lonely Signal Burns"
Paul McAuley: "Macy Minnot's Last Christmas on Dione, Ring Racing, Fiddler's Green, the Potter's Garden"
Michael Bishop: "Twenty Lights to 'The Land of Snow'"
Carrie Vaughn: "Astrophilia"
Adam Roberts: "What Did Tessimond Tell You?"
Megan Lindholm: "Old Paint"
David Moles: "Chitai Heiki Koronbin"
Robert Reed: "Katabasis"
Alastair Reynolds: "The Water Thief"
Linda Nagata: "Nightside on Callisto"
Lavie Tidhar: "Under the Eaves"
Steven Popkes: "Sudden, Broken, and Unexpected"
Robert Charles Wilson: "Fireborn"
Vandana Singh: "Ruminations in an Alien Tongue"
Hannu Rajaniemi: "Tyche and the Ants"
Sarah Monette and Elizabeth Bear: "The Wreck of the 'Charles Dexter Ward'"
Christopher Barzak: "Invisible Men"
Aliette de Bodard: "Ship's Brother"
Robert Reed: "Eater-of-Bone"

Release details
 2013, United States, St. Martin's Press , Pub date July 23, 2013, Hardcover 
 2013, United States, St. Martin's Griffin , Pub date July 23, 2013, Trade paperback 
 2013, United States, St. Martin's Press , Pub date July 23, 2013, e-book

References

External links
 
Book review by Mark Watson, Best SF

2013 anthologies
30
St. Martin's Press books
Books with cover art by Michael Whelan
2010s science fiction works